The badminton mixed doubles tournament at the 1990 Asian Games in Beijing Sports Complex, Beijing, China took place from 2 October to 6 October.

The South Korea duo of Park Joo-bong and Chung Myung-hee won the gold in this tournament after beating an Indonesian pair in the final.

China and another team from Indonesia shared the bronze medal.

Schedule
All times are China Standard Time (UTC+08:00)

Results

References
Results

External links
 Olympic Council of Asia

Mixed doubles